UFC Fight Night: Font vs. Garbrandt (also known as UFC Fight Night 188, UFC on ESPN+ 46 and UFC Vegas 27) was a mixed martial arts event produced by the Ultimate Fighting Championship that took place on May 22, 2021 at the UFC Apex facility in Enterprise, Nevada, part of the Las Vegas Metropolitan Area, United States.

Background
A bantamweight bout between former UFC Bantamweight Champion Cody Garbrandt and Rob Font served as the main event.

Ricardo Ramos and Bill Algeo were originally scheduled to meet in a bantamweight bout five weeks earlier at UFC on ESPN: Whittaker vs. Gastelum, but Ramos was pulled from the fight during the week leading up to the event after he tested positive for COVID-19. The pairing was left intact and took place at this event.

Denys Bondar was expected to face Victor Rodriguez in a flyweight bout at the event. However, Bondar was forced to pull out in late April due to an injury and was replaced by Bruno Gustavo da Silva.

Promotional newcomer Danyelle Wolf was expected to face former Invicta FC Featherweight Champion and UFC Women's Featherweight Championship challenger Felicia Spencer in a women's featherweight bout at the event. However, Wolf pulled out of the fight in early May due to an undisclosed injury and was replaced by Norma Dumont.

A heavyweight bout between Rodrigo Nascimento and Alan Baudot was originally expected to take place at this event. However, they were rescheduled for UFC on ESPN: Makhachev vs. Moisés after Baudot got injured.

A middleweight bout between Jack Hermansson and Edmen Shahbazyan was originally expected to take place one week prior at UFC 262. However, the bout was postponed due to a COVID-19 case in Hermansson's camp and took place at this event instead.

Ben Rothwell and Philipe Lins were scheduled to meet in a heavyweight bout in March at UFC Fight Night: Edwards vs. Muhammad, but it was cancelled due to an injury to Rothwell. They were then rescheduled for UFC on ESPN: Rodriguez vs. Waterson, but the bout fell through once again as Lins got ill a day before their fight. They were then expected to compete at this event. However, yet again, Lins was pulled from the event for undisclosed reasons and briefly replaced by promotional newcomer Askar Mozharov. Just hours later, the Ukrainian subsequently announced that he would not be able to get a visa in time for the event. He was eventually replaced by fellow newcomer Chris Barnett.

A women's bantamweight bout between Stephanie Egger and Sarah Alpar was expected to serve as the card's first bout. However, Egger pulled out due to undisclosed reasons in the week leading up to the event and was replaced by Lupita Godinez. The bout was scrapped completely a day later as Godinez wasn't able to get her visa in time.

A flyweight bout between Raulian Paiva and David Dvořák was scheduled to take place at the event. However, Paiva pulled out of the fight on the day before the event due to ill effects related to his weight cut. He was replaced by promotional newcomer Juancamilo Ronderos. At the weigh-ins, Ronderos weighed in at 128.5 pounds, two and a half pounds over the division's non-title fight limit. The bout proceeded at catchweight and he was fined 20% of his purse, which went to Dvořák.

A lightweight bout between Yancy Medeiros and Damir Hadžović was scheduled for the event. However, it was pulled from the card just hours before taking place due to health issues with Hadžović.

UFC lightweight contender and color commentator Paul Felder, who was doing commentary for this event, announced his retirement from MMA during the live broadcast.

Results

Bonus awards
The following fighters received $50,000 bonuses.
Fight of the Night: Jared Vanderaa vs. Justin Tafa
Performance of the Night: Carla Esparza and  Bruno Gustavo da Silva

See also 

 List of UFC events
 List of current UFC fighters
 2021 in UFC

References 

UFC Fight Night
2021 in mixed martial arts
May 2021 sports events in the United States
2021 in sports in Nevada
Mixed martial arts in Las Vegas
Sports competitions in Las Vegas